John F. "Spike" Hughes is a Professor of Computer Science at Brown University.

Contributions
Hughes' research is in computer graphics, particularly those aspects of graphics involving substantial mathematics. He is perhaps best known as the co-author of many widely used textbooks in the field of computer graphics.

Hughes is an avid sailor, and for years maintained the FAQ for the Usenet rec.boats group.

Selected publications

References

External links
 John Hughes home page

Living people
Computer graphics professionals
Computer graphics researchers
Human–computer interaction researchers
Computer vision researchers
Brown University faculty
Year of birth missing (living people)